Camlet Way was a Roman road in England which ran roughly east–west between  Colchester (Camalodunum) in Essex and  Silchester (Calleva Atrebatum)  in Hampshire via St Albans (Verulamium). Camlet Way crossed the River Thames by bridge at Hedsor Wharf to Sashes Island near Cookham in Berkshire.

References

Roman roads in England
Archaeological sites in Berkshire